The 2018 Rugby League Commonwealth Championship was a rugby league nines tournament organised by the Rugby League International Federation (RLIF) to be played in Moreton Bay, Queensland, Australia in February 2018. The event, featured eight men's teams, six women's teams and three physical disability teams, was one of the exhibition sports for the 2018 Commonwealth Games and was in support of the bid for rugby league nines to be a full medal event at the 2022 Commonwealth Games.

The tournament was dominated by Australia, who won all three competitions.

Competing nations and pools
The 2014 tournament limited the men's competition to under-18 players. For this competition the upper age was increased to make the tournament an under-23 competition.

Fixtures
All the games were played at Dolphin Stadium, home of Queensland rugby league side, Redcliffe Dolphins, on 23 and 24 February. All the pool games in the men's and women's teams were played on 23 February with the play-offs and medal matches played on 24 February. In the physical disability tournament four match were played on the first day with two more and the gold medal match played on the second day.

All times are Queensland local time, UTC+10:00.

Women's tournament

Pool A

Pool B

Semi-finals and play-offs

Men's U23 tournament

Pool A

Pool B

Semi-finals and play-offs

Physical disabilities tournament

Pool stage

Play-off

Australia were declared the gold medalists due to having a better pool result.

Leading try-scorers
 Men's U23:  Addison Demetriou (7)
 Women's:  Nakia Davis-Welsh,  Kiritapu Demant,  Shontelle Stowers (4)
 Physical disability:  Mitchell Gleeson (2)

References

2018 Commonwealth Games
2018 in rugby league
International rugby league competitions hosted by Australia
Rugby league nines
Moreton Bay Region
Rugby league Commonwealth Championship